Sadgati is a 1981 Hindi television film directed by Satyajit Ray, based on a short story of same name by Munshi Premchand. Ray called this drama of a poor Dalit "a deeply angry film [...] not the anger of an exploding bomb but of a bow stretched taut and quivering."

Cast
 Om Puri as Dukhi
 Smita Patil as Jhuria
 Mohan Agashe as The Priest 
 Gita Siddharth as The  wife
 Richa Mishra as Dhania

Reception 
The Film Sufi's reviewer rated the film 3.5/5 and commented, "The Brahmin and his wife are not evil people, but they are comfortably situated inside a system that perpetuates injustice – and they take advantage of it for their own selfish gains. And those who remain, such as Dukhi and Jhuria, can do nothing but suffer. Dukhi was a dedicated believer in the social system in which he lived, even though he was an outcast. This filming of Sadgati has just the right tone for the telling of this tale. Besides the cinematography of Soumendu Roy, there is the impeccable work of Ray’s usual film editor, Dulal Dutta. And, as usual, there is Ray’s moody, low-key music that maintains the right tone." Shaikh Ayaz of The Indian Express noted, "Having the distinction of being Doordarshan’s first colour outing, Sadgati is 40 years old today but it’s message is still relevant".

References

External links

Satyajitray.org page

Films directed by Satyajit Ray
1981 films
1980s Hindi-language films
Films based on short fiction
Films about the caste system in India
Films about poverty in India
Adaptations of works by Premchand
Films with screenplays by Satyajit Ray
Doordarshan television films